Prof. Dato' Arif Perkasa Dr. Mohd Asri bin Zainul Abidin (born 1 January 1971), better known as MAZA, is an Islamic scholar, preacher, writer and lecturer from Malaysia. He is currently serving his second term as Mufti of Perlis since 2 February 2015. His first term had been from 1 November 2006 until 11 November 2008.

Early life and education 
Mohd Asri was educated at the religious secondary school Al-Irsyad in Seberang Perai, Penang, and furthered his study at the Islamic College Klang. He received his bachelor's degree in Arabic and Sharia, with honors from the University of Jordan; master's in Islamic studies from Universiti Sains Malaysia (USM), and PhD in Islamic Revealed Knowledge and Heritage (Qurʾan and Sunnah studies) from International Islamic University Malaysia. He also received five degrees in Hadith from India. He was also a Fellowship in Oxford Centre for Islamic Studies, University of Oxford, United Kingdom.

Career 
Mohd Asri is an active writer and commentator on Islam and religious issues. He was a columnist for two local Malay newspapers called Mingguan Malaysia and Sinar Harian. He is also a prolific writer who has published many books since 2003. He remains a permanent associate professor with Universiti Sains Malaysia while serving with the Office of Perlis Mufti. Known by the public as Dr. Maza (an acronym for his own name, Mohd Asri Zainul Abidin), he is popular among the young who follow his blog, Minda Tajdid and in columns on Malay newspapers.

Views and principles 
Mohd Asri's books reflect his concerns about what he considers to be fanaticism in madhhabs (schools of jurisprudence), criticism of Hadith fabrications, and condemnation of Shiism and some Sufi practices. He considers these phenomena not to be in line with “pure” Islam, and he has urged Muslims to return to what he believes are Islam's true teachings. He frequently cites sources often referred to by those conforming to the Salafi school of thought, such as Ibn Taymiyyah (d. 1328), particularly in the issues of human life and human rights, and accepts moderate ideas from the Salafi school. Unlike the perception that associates Salafism with rigidity, conservatism, and extremism in the Middle East, particularly in Saudi Arabia, Asri believes in the Salafi brand of “Sunnah Perlis,” emphasizing the freedom from madhhab rigidity that calls upon Muslims to return directly to the two major sources of Islam in dealing with religious issues, namely, the Qurʾan and Sunnah.

While Mohd Asri may be conservative on many aspects of religious rituals, some of his views on women's rights, religious freedom, and religious worship are largely recognized as progressive. He also urges Malaysian Muslims not to accept the Shafiʿi school as the only source of law, but to be more receptive of other schools of jurisprudence. This position departs from that advocated by the ulama in the Nusantara region, which largely adopts the Shafiʿi school.

Although he maintains an intentionally apolitical stance, political parties like United Malays National Organization (UMNO) and People Justice Party (PKR) are interested in him. As Mufti of Perlis, he is propagating the “Sunnah Perlis” teachings, the Salafi version of a revival and reform agenda (islah and tajdid), and its call for the “pure” version of Islam by referring directly to the Qurʾan and Sunnah and by superseding madhhabic interpretation

Criticism 
Although some have accused him of subscribing to Wahhabism, he does not accept Muhammad ibn Abd al-Wahhab (d. 1793) as a great scholar or consider him a moderate and progressive scholar. Asri can be characterized as a moderate scholar who urges Muslims to practice more than one madhhab simultaneously within Sunni Islamic doctrine, namely the Hanbali, Shafiʿi, Maliki, and Hanafi schools.

He is very vocal on Malaysia's political and religious contexts, and in criticizing the labeling of certain non-Muslim parties, especially the opposition Democratic Action Party (DAP) as kafir harbi (infidels against whom war can be waged) and efforts to amend the Syariah (the term used in Malaysia for Sharia) Courts (Criminal Jurisdiction) Act 1965 to allow certain Hudud punishments to be implemented in certain states in Malaysia.

On issues such as the environment, he is against pollution. He advocates modesty in fashion, particularly the proper attire for Muslim women, and Muslims can wear non-Muslim traditional dresses.

Personal life 
Mohd Asri is married with five children, namely Talhah, Intisor, Ibtihal, Dihyah and Irwa', respectively.

Honours and awards

Honours of Malaysia 
 :
  Companion of the Order of Prince Syed Sirajuddin Jamalullail of Perlis (SSP)
  The Order for Dato’ Titleholders – Dato' Arif Perkasa (2012)

Awards 
 Recipient of the Perlis 1427AH Maal Hijrah Figure Award.
 Recipient of the Perlis 1429AH Maal Hijrah Figure Award.
 Recipient of the University of Science Malaysia 1430AH Maal Hijrah Figure Award.

Books 
 Fanatik Mazahab Fekah & Kesan Negatifnya Terhadap Pemikiran Umat ISBN 978-967-13496-2-5
 Hadis Palsu Kesan Negatif Terhadap Imej Islam ISBN 978-967-13496-3-2
 Fabricated Hadith Upon The Image Of Islam ISBN 978-967-16744-3-7
 The Obligation of Understanding the Reality Before Issuuing a Fatwa ISBN 978-967-16744-5-1
 Kewajipan Memahami Realiti Sebelum Berfatwa ISBN 978-967-16-7442-0

References 

Articles in MalaysiaKini

1971 births
Living people
People from Penang
Malaysian people of Malay descent
Malaysian Muslims
Muftis in Malaysia
Malaysian motivational speakers
Sunni Muslim scholars of Islam
21st-century imams